James J. McCrea (died 31 January 1969) was an Irish politician, farmer and businessman. He was a Labour Party member of Seanad Éireann from 1948 to 1957. He was nominated by the Taoiseach to the 6th Seanad in 1948. He was elected to 7th Seanad in 1951 by the Administrative Panel, and to the 8th Seanad in 1954 by the Agricultural Panel. He did not contest the 1957 Seanad election.

He stood unsuccessfully for Dáil Éireann on two occasions. He stood as a Labour Party candidate for the Wicklow constituency; at the 1948 general election, and at the June 1953 by-election.

References

Year of birth missing
1969 deaths
Labour Party (Ireland) senators
Members of the 6th Seanad
Members of the 7th Seanad
Members of the 8th Seanad
Irish farmers
People from County Wicklow
Nominated members of Seanad Éireann